Bogdan Cristian Jica (born 3 iulie 2000) is a Romanian professional footballer who plays as a defender for Liga IV side ACS Mediaș. In his career, Jica also played for teams such as: Daco-Getica București or Dunărea Călărași.

References

External links
 
 

2000 births
Living people
People from Blaj
Romanian footballers
Association football defenders
Liga I players
Liga II players
CS Gaz Metan Mediaș players
ASC Daco-Getica București players
FC Dunărea Călărași players
FC Hermannstadt players